Strenuaeva is a genus of Cambrian trilobite thought to show sexual dimorphism.

References

Ptychopariida genera
Cambrian trilobites
Fossils of Sweden